The following lists events that happened during 2015 in the Islamic Republic of Iran.

Incumbents
President: Hassan Rouhani 
Vice President: Eshaq Jahangiri 
Supreme Leader: Ali Khamenei

Events

February
 February 2 – Iran's Fajr satellite is successfully placed in the orbit.

May
 May 7 – Ethnic Kurds riot in Mahabad following the unexplained death on 4 May 2015 of Farinaz Khosravani, a 25-year-old Kurdish hotel chambermaid. Khosravani fell to her death from a fourth-floor window of the Tara, the hotel where she worked. Anger mounted following reports that Khosravani died attempting to escape an Iranian official who was threatening to rape her. The rioters reportedly set fire to the hotel. Unrest and violence spread to other Kurdish cities in Iran.

July
 July 14 – Iran agrees to long-term limits of its nuclear program in exchange for sanctions relief.

Sports
 2014–15 Iranian Futsal Super League

References

 
Iran
Iran
2010s in Iran
Years of the 21st century in Iran